{{Infobox Podcast
|title          = Desus vs. Mero
|image          = File:DesusvsMero.jpg
|caption        = 
|hosting        = Desus NiceThe Kid Mero
|language       = English
|rss            = 
|atom           = 
|updates        = 
|length         = 
|camera         = Paul–Perez Gallan
|director         = 
|production     = Donnie KwakKeith CecereRebecca NilesMatt Maltese
|picture format = 
|video format   = 
|audio format   = 
|began          = 18 December 2013
|ended          = 31 December 2014
|genre          = Comedy, entertainment, talk
|ratings        = 
|cited_for      = 
|cited_as       = 
|provider       = Complex TV
|license        = 
|url            = Desus vs. Mero
|num_episodes   = 46
|list_episodes  = Desus vs. Mero#Episodes
|opentheme      = Desus vs. Mero theme, produced by The Letter "C" and DJ Treats
|Misc           = 
|Audio caption  = 
}}Desus vs. Mero is a weekly podcast show and web series hosted by Bronx natives Desus Nice and The Kid Mero. The podcast was first released on 18 December 2013 and after 46 episodes it ended on 31 December 2014.Can Online Stars Desus vs. Mero Succeed IRL?13 Awesome Podcasts Bringing Black Voices To The Mic The duo has since gone on to appear on TV series such as MTV2's Guy Code, Uncommon Sense, Joking Off, and hosts Desus & Mero (2016) on Viceland and Desus & Mero (2019)'' on Showtime.

Episodes

References

Comedy and humor podcasts
2013 podcast debuts
2014 podcast endings